The following television stations broadcast on digital or analog channel 9 in Canada:

 CBET-DT in Windsor, Ontario
 CBKT-DT in Regina, Saskatchewan
 CBOFT-DT in Ottawa, Ontario
 CFCN-TV-3 in Brooks, Alberta
 CFJC-TV-4 in Clinton, British Columbia
 CFTF-DT-5 in Baie-Comeau, Quebec
 CFTO-DT in Toronto, Ontario
 CHAN-TV-5 in Brackendale, British Columbia
 CHAN-TV-7 in Whistler, British Columbia
 CHAU-DT-10 in Tracadie, New Brunswick
 CHBC-TV-4 in Salmon Arm, British Columbia
 CHKM-TV-1 in Pritchard, British Columbia
 CHMG-TV in Quebec City, Quebec
 CHRP-TV-2 in Revelstoke, British Columbia
 CICO-DT-9 in Thunder Bay, Ontario
 CIHF-TV-6 in Bridgewater, Nova Scotia
 CIMT-DT in Rivière-du-Loup, Quebec
 CIPA-TV in Prince Albert, Saskatchewan
 CISA-TV-5 in Pincher Creek, Alberta
 CITO-TV-4 in Chapleau, Ontario
 CIVG-DT in Sept-Iles, Quebec
 CJCB-TV-2 in Antigonish, Nova Scotia
 CJCB-TV-3 in Dingwall, Nova Scotia
 CJDG-TV-4 in Matagami, Quebec
 CKAM-TV-3 in Blackville, New Brunswick
 CKLT-DT in Saint John, New Brunswick
 CKRN-DT in Rouyn-Noranda, Quebec
 CKSA-TV-2 in Bonnyville, Alberta
 CKSH-DT in Sherbrooke, Quebec
 CKYT-TV in Thompson, Manitoba
 CKVR-DT in Barrie, Ontario
The following stations, which are no longer licensed, formerly broadcast on channel 9:

 CKNC-TV in Sudbury, Ontario

09 TV stations in Canada